Cassopolis Ross Beatty High School is a public high school in Cassopolis, Michigan, United States. It is part of the Cassopolis Public Schools district.

Demographics 
The demographic breakdown of the 393 students enrolled in 2017–18 was:
 Boys - 50.9%
 Girls - 49.1%
 Native American/Alaskan - 0.5%
 Asian - 3.3%
 Black - 18.1%
 Hispanic - 6.6%
 Native Hawaiian/Pacific islander - 0.3%
 White - 61.3%
 Multiracial - 9.9%

63.4% of the students were eligible for free or reduced-cost lunch. For 2017–18, this was a Title I school.

Athletics 
The Cassopolis Rangers compete in the Southwest 10 Conference. The school colors are blue and white, and the following Michigan High School Athletic Association (MHSAA) sanctioned sports offered, are:

 Baseball (boys)
 Basketball (girls and boys)
 Cross country (girls and boys)
 Football (8 player) (boys)
 Golf (boys and girls)
 Boys state champion - 1971, 1973
 Soccer (girls and boys)
 Softball (girls)
 Track and field (girls and boys)
 Boys state champion - 1991
 Volleyball (girls)
 Wrestling (boys)

Theater-Drama Club
The has always been a sense of pride when it come the Theater and Drama Club and the Thespian Troupe 2323. Ada Barr was the English and Drama teacher at the High school in the late 80's.

References

External links 
 

Schools in Cass County, Michigan
Public middle schools in Michigan
Public high schools in Michigan